Scott Shields is an American blogger and Democratic Party political activist. Born in Englewood, New Jersey in 1978, he grew up in Morris County, NJ and graduated from Montville Township High School. He rose to prominence in 2005 as a front-page writer for MyDD covering, among other topics, health care politics, labor rights, and the 2005 New Jersey Governor's race.

In 2006, Shields was employed with the campaign of US Senator Bob Menendez in New Jersey.  During the campaign, his work was profiled in The Philadelphia Inquirer, The Record of Bergen County, and The New Yorker.  He was named one of the years' "Top Political Operatives" by the website PoliticsNJ.com.

His writing can also be seen on MyDD, DailyKos, BlueJersey, and other prominent blogs.

References

1978 births
Living people
American bloggers
People from Englewood, New Jersey
Montville Township High School alumni